Linakaneng is a community council located in the Mokhotlong District of Lesotho. Its population in 2006 was 4,452.

Villages
The community of Linakaneng includes the villages of Boiketlo, Boinyatso, Chesalaene, Ha Matjota, Ha Moepanyane, Ha Mosollane, Ha Polaki, Ha Sekoti, Ha Soai, Khorong, Khubetsoana, Likotjaneng, Makula-Peea, Manganeng, Mankeng, Maphatsing, Meeling, Mohloaing, Mokotleng, Moreneng, Mothating, Motse-Mocha, Motsitseng, Nokeng, Rosemane, Sekokong, Tlohang and Tsatsanyane.

References

External links
 Google map of community villages

Populated places in Mokhotlong District